Lectionary 257, designated by siglum ℓ 257 (in the Gregory-Aland numbering) is a Greek manuscript of the New Testament, on parchment. It is dated by a colophon to 1305 or 1306. Scrivener labelled it as 69a, Gregory by 81a. The manuscript has survived in a fragmentary condition.

Description 

The codex contains lessons from the Acts of the Apostles and Epistles lectionary (Apostolarium), on 178 parchment leaves, with numerous lacunae.

The text is written in Greek large minuscule letters, in one column per page, 28-29 lines per page. It contains Synaxarion.

History 

According to the colophon it was written in 1305 or 1306 by Ignatius, a scribe.

The manuscript was brought of Nicolas Parassoh on 27 June 1874.

The manuscript was added to the list of New Testament manuscripts by Scrivener (number 69a) and Gregory (number 81a). Gregory saw the manuscript in 1883.

The manuscript is not cited in the critical editions of the Greek New Testament (UBS3).

Currently the codex is housed at the British Library (Add MS 29714) in London.

See also 

 List of New Testament lectionaries
 Biblical manuscript
 Textual criticism
 Lectionary 259

Notes and references

Bibliography 

 
 A. Turyn, Dated Greek Manuscripts of the Thirteenth and Fourteenth Centuries in the Libraries of Great Britain, Dumbarton Oaks Series XVII, (Washington, D. C., 1980), 6, p. 69

Greek New Testament lectionaries
12th-century biblical manuscripts
British Library additional manuscripts